

SEAT Bocanegra concept car

The SEAT Bocanegra is a three-door supermini concept car, built by the Spanish automaker SEAT and designed by former Lamborghini designer Luc Donckerwolke who at the moment had been assigned SEAT's design director. 

It was presented at the 2008 Geneva Motor Show, sporting a more aggressive image as a showcase for the fifth-generation SEAT Ibiza, which was introduced in May 2008 at the Madrid Motor Show. The name Bocanegra - standing for "Black Mouth" in Spanish - derives from the whole front bumper made out of black-painted plastic with the headlights encased in clear perspex, tracing back to a previous SEAT model from the 1970s, the 1200 Sport which at the time had been nicknamed Bocanegra because of its black plastic front end.

It has a 1.4-liter TSI engine giving , and a newly presented seven-speed direct shift gearbox.

SEAT Bocanegra production model

The Bocanegra concept car's front end was carried to the fourth generation of the SEAT Ibiza as a special edition featuring the Bocanegra name, meant to be carried over in a limited series of 1,000 cars per year production.  A Boconegra version of the Ibiza ST estate was shown as a concept at Wörthersee 2010.

References

External links
Official site
Autoblog entry
Photo gallery

Bocanegra
Bocanegra